The Morosco Theatre was a Broadway theatre near Times Square in New York City from 1917 to 1982. It housed many notable productions and its demolition, along with four adjacent theaters, was controversial.

History
Located at 217 West 45th Street, the Morosco Theatre was designed by architect Herbert J. Krapp for the Shubert family, who constructed it for Oliver Morosco in gratitude for his helping them break the monopoly of the Theatrical Syndicate. It had approximately 955 seats.  After an invitation-only preview performance on February 4, 1917, it opened to the public on February 5. The inaugural production was Canary Cottage, a musical with a book by Morosco and a score by Earl Carroll.

The Shuberts lost the building in the Great Depression, and City Playhouses, Inc. bought it at auction in 1943. It was sold in 1968 to Bankers Trust Company and, after a massive "Save the Theatres" protest movement led by Joe Papp and supported by various actors and other theatrical folk failed, it was razed in 1982, along with the first Helen Hayes, the Bijou, and remnants of the Astor and the 
Gaiety theaters; it was replaced by the 49-story Marriott Marquis hotel and Marquis Theatre.

Notable productions

References 
Notes

External links

1917 establishments in New York (state)
Former Broadway theatres
Buildings and structures demolished in 1982
Demolished buildings and structures in Manhattan
Former theatres in Manhattan
Theater District, Manhattan
Theatres completed in 1917